The 1986 New Zealand Rugby Union tour of France was a series of eight matches played by the New Zealand national rugby union team (the All Blacks) in France in October and November 1986. The All Blacks won seven of their eight games, losing only the second of the two internationals against France.

Results 

Scores and results list All Blacks' points tally first.

Touring party

Coach: Brian Lochore
Captain: Jock Hobbs

Backs
John Gallagher (Wellington)
Kieran Crowley (Taranaki)
Marty Berry (Wellington)
Craig Green (Canterbury)
John Kirwan (Auckland)
Terry Wright (Auckland)
Joe Stanley (Auckland)
Arthur Stone ( Bay of Plenty)
Grant Fox (Auckland)
Frano Botica (North Harbour)
David Kirk (Auckland)
Dean Kenny (Otago)

Forwards
Steve McDowall (Auckland)
John Drake (Auckland)
Kevin Boroevich (Wellington)
Richard Loe (Canterbury)
Sean Fitzpatrick (Auckland)
Hika Reid (Bay of Plenty)
Gary Whetton (Auckland)
Michael Speight (Northland)
Murray Pierce (Wellington)
Andy Earl (Canterbury)
Mike Brewer (Otago)
Mark Brooke-Cowden (Auckland)
Mark Shaw ( Hawkes Bay)
Jock Hobbs (Canterbury)
Buck Shelford (North Harbour)

References

 Allblacks.com http://stats.allblacks.com/asp/tourbreak.asp?IDID=102

1986 rugby union tours
1986
1986
1986 in New Zealand rugby union
1986–87 in French rugby union
1986–87 in European rugby union